is an interchange railway station on the high-speed Hokuriku Shinkansen line and Jōhana Line in Takaoka, Toyama, Japan, operated by West Japan Railway Company (JR West).

Lines
Semi-fast Hakutaka Tokyo-to-Kanazawa services and all-stations Tsurugi Toyama-to-Kanazawa shuttle services stop at Shin-Takaoka.

Station layout
The station consists of two elevated side platforms for the Hokuriku Shinkansen running east to west, with exits on the north and south sides. The Jōhana Line has a single side platform located at ground level, running north to south on the west side of the station complex. A west exit is also provided to the west of the Jōhana Line platforms.

Platforms
The single-track Jōhana Line is served by an un-numbered ground-level side platform.

The elevated shinkansen platforms consist of two 312 m long side platforms serving two tracks. The platforms are fitted with chest-high platform edge doors.

Facilities
The station has a "Midori no Madoguchi" staffed ticket office.

Adjacent stations

History

Although provisionally named Shin-Takaoka Station from its conception, the name was formally finalized and announced in June 2013. A public survey was conducted in 2012, with the following names put forward.
  (173 votes)
  (163 votes)
  (107 votes)
  (59 votes)
  (43 votes)

The name Shin-Takaoka was however ultimately selected by JR West.

The groundbreaking ceremony for the Johana Line station building was held on 14 September 2013.

Surrounding area
 Takaoka Station (on the Ainokaze Toyama Railway Line, approximately 1 km away)
 Zuiryū-ji Temple, a 15-minute walk away
 Aeon Mall Takaoka

See also
 List of railway stations in Japan

References

External links

  

Railway stations in Toyama Prefecture
Hokuriku Shinkansen
Stations of West Japan Railway Company
Railway stations in Japan opened in 2015
Takaoka, Toyama